Bir-Abdallah is a  locality in southern Tunisia, in North Africa. It is located at 35° 33' 10" N,  9° 56' 28" E.

The site has a well from antiquity and is nearby to El Mejabra, Ghedir el Mahfoura and Feddane el Begar.

History
A number of Roman ruins dot the opposite bank of the Oued El Hatech. During the Roman Empire, Bir Abdallah was the site of a Roman town which was the seat of an ancient Christian Bishopric, which survives to this day as a titular see of the Roman Catholic Church.

The history] of the town changed forever with the foundation of Kairouan about the year 670 when the Arab general Uqba ibn Nafi of Amir Muauia selected the nearby village of Kamounia  as the location of a military post for the conquest of the Maghreb. Kairouan is today one of the Holy cities of Islam.

Climate

References

Catholic titular sees in Africa
Roman towns and cities in Tunisia
Archaeological sites in Tunisia
Muslim conquest of the Maghreb